Justin Horo (born 7 September 1986) is a New Zealand professional rugby league footballer who last played as a er and  for Wakefield Trinity in the Super League. He previously played for the Parramatta Eels and the Manly Warringah Sea Eagles in the NRL.

Background
Born in Auckland, New Zealand, he is of Maori descent. His father, Mark Horo is New Zealand Maori and his mother is of Laos descent. His uncle is Shane Horo.

Playing career
Horo played his junior football for the St Clair Comets and Cambridge Park, playing SG Ball & Jersey Flegg at the Roosters before signing with the Parramatta Eels.

In Round 3 of the 2010 NRL season he made his NRL debut for the Parramatta Eels against the Wests Tigers. Later that year he re-signed with the Parramatta Eels on a 3-year contract, knocking back offers from the Newcastle Knights, the North Queensland Cowboys and the Canterbury-Bankstown Bulldogs. After making his debut, Horo played in all the remaining games of the 2010 season and received the 2010 Parramatta Eels season's rookie of the year award.

Horo played throughout the 2011 season but in 2012 he was dropped from the Parramatta team after a first round loss, and featured in just 6 games for the year. Horo said, "Steve (Kearney) said I had a few things to work on and I ended up getting a few injuries after that. I tore ligaments in my ankle and then I had a rotator-cuff injury in my shoulder. Once I got back to full fitness I ended up stringing a few games together at the end but that was after Mooks had gone."

After being told he was not in the Eels future plans early in the 2012 season, Horo considered playing park football in France with a friend before ending up signing a 2-year contract with the Manly-Warringah Sea Eagles on 12 November from the 2013 season, after being released from the final year of his Eels contract. In the 2013 season, he scored 8 tries from 18 games (to Round 20 including 2 byes), playing in the back row with representative forwards Anthony Watmough and Glenn Stewart.

On 6 August 2015, Horo signed a 2-year contract to play in the Super League for French club the Catalans Dragons starting in 2016. In September 2017 he signed a two-year deal with Wakefield Trinity.

Representative career
In 2010, Horo played for the New Zealand Māori team against England.

Personal life
Horo is from the Tainui iwi. His father is former New Zealand international Mark Horo and he has stated his allegiance to the Kiwis. His uncle, Shane Horo, also represented New Zealand. Horo recently competed in a high profile match race against multi-sport athlete Jordan Simi. Horo won the race but rumours that Horo had Jordan Simis part of the track watered pre-race to gain an advantage. Horo avoided conviction for a cocaine charge, after being caught by police with possession and a rolled up note, in a Sydney pub in early 2021

References

External links

Wakefield Trinity profile
Catalans Dragons profile
SL profile

1986 births
Living people
Catalans Dragons players
New Zealand rugby league players
New Zealand Māori rugby league players
New Zealand Māori rugby league team players
Manly Warringah Sea Eagles players
Parramatta Eels players
Rugby league players from Auckland
Rugby league second-rows
Rugby league locks
Rugby league hookers
Wentworthville Magpies players